Bulbothrix meizospora is a species of foliose lichen in the family Parmeliaceae. It is found in Africa, Asia, and South America, where it grows on tree bark.

Taxonomy
The lichen was first formally described by Finnish lichenologist William Nylander in 1860 as Parmelia tiliacea var. meizospora ; he later transferred it to the genus Parmelia and promoted it to full species status in 1869. In 1974 Mason Hale transferred the group of species called Parmelia series Bicornutae  to the genus Bulbothrix, including Bulbothrix meizospora. The type was collected in the Nilgiri Mountains in India.

According to Michel Navarro Benatti, who wrote a 2012 review on the Bulbothrix species with medullary salazinic acid, Bulbothrix vainioi  is a synonym of Bulbothrix meizospora. Found in Brazil, B. vainioi was created to hold specimens with ascospores over 12 µm long that were included by Hale provisionally in Bulbothrix sensibilis. However, as Benatti explained, this spore size is well within the range reported for B. meizospora, and both of the taxa are morphologically and chemically identical (as determined with lichen spot tests).

Description
The thallus comprises small, tightly attached (adnate) and irregularly branched lobes that are 2–4 mm wide. Reproductive structures such as pustules, soredia, and isidia are absent from the thallus. The medulla is white, while the lower thallus surface is dull, black, wrinkled, and papillate (covered with small protuberances), with a dark brown margin that measures 0.1–3 mm wide. Some of the lobes have simple (unbranched) black rhizines on the margins, while others have a rhizine-free border.

The apothecia are cup-shaped, measuring 1–6 mm in diameter with a smooth margin and a brown disc. Ascospores are ellipsoid to ovoid in shape, and typically measure 12–14 by 8–10 μm. Secondary compounds produced by Bulbothrix meizospora include atranorin and chloratranorin in the cortex, and consalazinic acid and salazinic acid in the medulla.

Habitat and distribution
In Asia, Bulbothrix meizospora is found in India, Thailand, Pakistan, and Nepal. In Africa, it has been recorded from Camaroon, Kenya, Malawi, and Tanzania. In South America, it is known from Brazil (originally reported as Bulbothrix vainioi).

References

Lichens described in 1860
Lichen species
Lichens of Africa
Lichens of Asia
Lichens of Brazil
Parmeliaceae
Taxa named by William Nylander (botanist)